Funcke is a surname. Notable people with the surname include:

 Friedrich Funcke (1642–1699), German composer
 Liselotte Funcke (1918–2012), German liberal politician, vice president of federal parliament, state Minister of Economy in North Rhine-Westphalia, Federal Commissioner for Foreigners
 Ross Funcke (born 1977), Australian rules footballer